The Powerful United Homeland Party, also known as the Strong United Homeland Party is an Armenian political party in Artsakh.

History
The Powerful United Homeland Party's founder and current party leader is Vyacheslav Hyusnunts, a former military general and former member of the Communist Party of Artsakh. The party currently has no parliamentary representation within the National Assembly and acts as an extra-parliamentary force.

Prior to the 2020 Artsakhian general election, the party endorsed Masis Mayilyan and his New Artsakh Alliance.

Ideology
The party considers the safety and security of the Artsakh Republic a top priority. The party supports future reunification of Artsakh with Armenia, fighting corruption, growing the economy, and modernizing the military. The party also advocates for establishing formal relations between Artsakh and the European Union and Commonwealth of Independent States.

Activities
On 2 October 2019, the party met with representatives of the Artsakh's branch of the Armenian Revolutionary Federation, where political issues were discussed.

See also

List of political parties in Artsakh
Politics of Artsakh

References

External links
 Powerful United Homeland Party on Facebook

Political parties in the Republic of Artsakh
Political parties with year of establishment missing